Gudrun Grömer (born 7 November 1919) was an Austrian diver. She competed in two events at the 1948 Summer Olympics.

References

External links
 

1919 births
Possibly living people
Austrian female divers
Olympic divers of Austria
Divers at the 1948 Summer Olympics